Jennifer Braun (born 28 April 1991) is a German singer. She was runner-up at the talent show Unser Star für Oslo, Germany's national pre-selection show for the Eurovision Song Contest 2010. Her first music single was "I Care for You".

Biography

Early life
Jennifer Braun was born on 28 April 1991 in Rüdesheim am Rhein and lives in Eltville, Germany. Her father works in industrial asset liquidation and her mother is a saleslady. Braun attends the Obermayr high school in Wiesbaden-Erbenheim. Until 2010, she had her most notable appearances as a singer with her band Rewind at town festivals and at the Wiesbaden wine festival. She took part in the seventh season's castings of Deutschland sucht den Superstar, the German edition of Pop Idol, however, she was eliminated after the first recall round.

2010: Unser Star für Oslo
In 2010, Braun applied for the talent show Unser Star für Oslo (Our Star for Oslo), a newly created national television programme to select the German entry for the Eurovision Song Contest 2010 in Oslo. The show was organised by public broadcaster ARD and private television channel ProSieben, as well as entertainer and music producer Stefan Raab. Among 4,500 entrants, Braun was picked as one of the 20 contestants for the show.

Braun mostly performed well-known pop and rock ballads to reach the show's semi-final, in which she sang the rock song "Heavy Cross" by Gossip and Christina Aguilera's ballad "Hurt". The jury panel praised her powerful voice and her confident performances and she beat favoured contestant Christian Durstewitz to progress to the last show. In the final on 12 March 2010, Braun sang three songs specifically submitted for the contest, "Bee", "Satellite", and "I Care for You". Through televoting, the audience chose "I Care for You" to be her designated song in case she wins the show, however, she was defeated in the final vote by Lena Meyer-Landrut, the heavy favourite to win Unser Star für Oslo from the first night.

All songs performed in the final of Unser Star für Oslo were made available for digital download on iTunes Germany and Musicload.de the following day. Braun's "I Care for You" reached position number 10 in the German singles chart through digital downloads only, while her versions of "Bee" and "Satellite" reached the top 40 in Germany. "I Care for You" also charted in Austria.

Braun and Lena Meyer-Landrut both sang different versions of "Bee" and "Satellite" in the final

2010–present: First studio album
Braun was put under contract by Universal Music. She had her first major appearance outside Unser Star für Oslo on the show "Fernsehgarten" on 23 May 2010. She is currently working on her first album.

Discography

Singles"I Care for You", "Bee" and "Satellite" charted simultaneously''

References

External links

 
 Website of the band Rewind 
 Profile at Eurovision.ndr.de 
 Profile at Unser-Star-fuer-Oslo.de 
 Videos of Braun's performances at Unser-Star-fuer-Oslo.de 
 Performing I Care For You at ZDF-Fernsehgarten, 24 May 2010

1991 births
Living people
People from Wiesbaden
21st-century German women singers